Rafflesia schadenbergiana is a parasitic plant species of the genus Rafflesia. Known as "bó-o" to the Bagobo tribe and "kolon busaw" to the Higaonon tribe of Bukidnon, it has the largest flower among the Rafflesia species found in the Philippines with a diameter ranging from 52 to 80 centimeters. It has also the second largest flower in the genus after R. arnoldii.

This species was first collected in the vicinity of Mount Apo, Mindanao during an expedition led by Schadenberg and Koch in 1882. It was not seen for more than a century and was assumed to be extinct until Pascal Lays found a specimen of this species in South Cotabato in 1994 while studying the Tasaday. A population of this rare Rafflesia species was recently discovered in Baungon, Bukidnon, just outside the buffer zone of the Mount Kitanglad Natural Park in 2007.

R. schadenbergiana is endemic to the island of Mindanao, Philippines.

Notes

References

External links
 Parasitic Plant Connection: Rafflesia schadenbergiana page

schadenbergiana
Endemic flora of the Philippines
Flora of Mindanao